The Elliot Willden House, at 340 S. Riverside Lane in Beaver, Utah, is a historic stone house built in c.1885, expanding on an older stone cabin.  It was listed on the National Register of Historic Places in 1983.

The 1885 house facade is built of pink rock and has elements of Greek Revival style; the older cabin portion, to the rear, is made of black rock.

References

Houses on the National Register of Historic Places in Utah
Greek Revival architecture in Utah
Residential buildings completed in 1885
Beaver County, Utah